"Jesus Was Way Cool" is a song by avant-garde band King Missile. It appears on the band's 1990 album Mystical Shit.

Content
In "Jesus Was Way Cool," frontman John S. Hall, over a mellow and drawn out piano figure, delivers an enthusiastic deadpan monologue in which he declares Jesus "way cool" for such skills as healing, walking on water, and turning water into wine. Hall states that Jesus did "anything he wanted to do," and, anachronistically, could have surpassed the achievements of Jimi Hendrix, Wayne Gretzky, and Mikhail Baryshnikov in their respective fields. Hall then postulates that the crucifixion of Jesus was in fact motivated by jealousy of his coolness, and that the subsequent resurrection of Jesus is further evidence of said coolness. To further deadpan effect, Hall concludes, "No wonder there are so many Christians."

In the liner notes of the compilation Fluting on the Hump, Hall described "Jesus Was Way Cool" as a reflection on Catholicism and poetry:

Commercial performance
Through the popularity of "Jesus Was Way Cool," Mystical Shit hit #1 on the CMJ charts, and the band was signed by a major label, Atlantic Records. This series of events led Hall to make a habit of joking, "'Jesus' got me signed to Atlantic Records."

The song was used in an episode of the Adult Swim series "Off the Air".

Alternative version
The song appears with slightly different lyrics and a radically different arrangement as "Jesus Was Way Cool (Millennium Edition)" on the band's 2003 album The Psychopathology of Everyday Life.  Additionally, a live version appears on the single for "My Heart Is A Flower," in which Hall alters the lyrics slightly.

Cover version
A German-language version of the song, entitled "Jesus was so Cool", appears on the 1996 album "Das Jahr Schnee" by East German art rock band Herbst in Peking

References

King Missile songs
Experimental rock songs
1990 singles
1990 songs
Songs written by John S. Hall
Songs about Jesus
Songs written by Chris Xefos